The fifth series of The Great British Sewing Bee began on 12 February 2019 following a three-year hiatus. Joe Lycett replaced Claudia Winkleman as the presenter of the show, with both Esme Young and Patrick Grant returning as judges. The series was shot at 47-49 Tanner Street, Bermondsey, though the exterior shots are of 1 Tanner Street.

Sewers

Results and Eliminations 

 Sewer was the series winner

 Sewer was the series runner-up

 Best Garment: Sewer won "Garment of the Week"

 One of the judge's favourite sewers

 Sewer was safe and got through to next round

 One of the judge's least favourite sewers

 Sewer was eliminated

Episodes 

 Sewer eliminated   Garment of the Week

Episode 1: Cotton Week

Episode 2: Children's Week

Episode 3: 70s Week

The sewers' machines were replaced by vintage machines from the 1970s that they used the whole week.

Episode 4: Technical Fabric Week

Episode 5: Reduce, Reuse, and Recycle Week 

N.B In the alteration challenge, the sewers were given a bin filled with the offcuts from the fabric they used over the last four weeks; the bins were tipped out so that the sewers had access to everyone who was still in the competition's offcuts from the previous weeks.

Episode 6: British and Irish Fabric Week

Episode 7: World Sewing Week

Episode 8: Special Occasion Week

Ratings

Official ratings are taken from BARB.

References

2019 British television seasons
The Great British Sewing Bee